Batterson is a surname. Notable people with the surname include:

Dim Batterson (1881–1935), American college and professional football coach
Hermon Griswold Batterson (1827–1903), American Episcopal priest
James G. Batterson (1823–1901), American designer and builder, owner of New England Granite Works, founder of Travelers Insurance Company
Mark Batterson, American pastor and author
John Batterson Stetson (1830–1906), American hatter

See also 
Batterson Block – High Street Historic District, Hartford, Connecticut, US
Batterson Park, public park owned by the City of Hartford, Connecticut, US
Bateson
Batson
Bötersen